Ledge Point is a small coastal township 105 km north of Perth, Western Australia.  It was established to service the local fishing and crayfishing industries.

The town's name originates from the nearby coastal feature of the same name, a series of rocky ledges on the point that was first described in an 1875 hydrographic survey. The Gingin Road Board requested that land be set aside in the area in 1937 for camping and recreation purposes. In 1952 there were three squatters' shacks that had been built in the reserve and once a road was completed into the area in 1953 more people began to request land leases. The government decided to subdivide the area in 1954 and sell blocks for retirees and holiday housing. The town was gazetted in 1955.

The area is well known as a windsurfing venue, and in January each year the prestigious Ledge Point to Lancelin Windsurfing Classic draws competitors from around the world.

In 1963, divers discovered the wreck of the Dutch East India Company ship Vergulde Draeck (Gilt Dragon) which sank on 28 April 1656 after striking reef near Ledge Point. It was one of the earliest wrecks of a European ship on Australian shores. In 1972, a full expedition was mounted to systematically explore the remains of the ship and its fittings. Damage by looters had left little intact, but over several months  a quantity of artefacts was recovered, which are now displayed at maritime museums in Geraldton and Fremantle.

See also
 History of Western Australia

References 

Coastal towns in Western Australia
Fishing communities in Australia
Shire of Gingin